High Level Bridge  may refer to:

 High Level Bridge, River Tyne, road and railway bridge between Newcastle upon Tyne and Gateshead, in North East England
 High Level Bridge (Edmonton), over the North Saskatchewan River in Edmonton, Alberta, Canada
 Lethbridge Viaduct, commonly known as the High Level Bridge, over the Oldman River in Lethbridge, Alberta, Canada
 Robert H. Mollohan-Jefferson Street Bridge, locally known as the High Level Bridge, over the Monongahela River, in Fairmont, West Virginia
 Homestead Grays Bridge, formerly known as the Homestead High Level Bridge, over the Monongahela River, between the cities of Pittsburgh and Homestead, in Pennsylvania
Anthony Wayne Bridge, commonly known as the High Level Bridge, over the Maumee River, in Toledo, Ohio

See also
 High level (disambiguation)
 Highbridge (disambiguation)